WGMC is a listener-supported station licensed to Greece, New York and serving Rochester, New York, United States, broadcasting on 90.1 MHz FM and streaming on the Internet at www.jazz901.org. On air, the station is identified as "Jazz 90.1" in reference to its FM frequency. WGMC specializes in all styles of jazz, but is also an important outlet for music and voices that do not make it onto commercial radio. WGMC's longest-running show is Polka Bandstand. 

The station also hosts a blues show on Sunday evenings, a soul jazz program (The Soul Jazz Spectrum) on Friday nights, a program of avant-garde jazz (Northstar Sounds) on Tuesday nights, and other specialty shows featuring subgenres of jazz.

On June 6, 2009, WGMC added its first call-in talk show, Sound Bytes, which had previously been broadcast on WHAM and WXXI.

The WGMC studio is located in the Greece Olympia High School media center.

Disc jockeys/online personalities 
WGMC's regular DJs and on-air personalities include:

 Derrick Lucas
 Mike Velazquez
 Phil Dodd
 Rob Linton (station manager)
 Lynda Wildman
 Dan Gross
 Otto Bruno
 Rick Petrie
 Jon Greenbaum
 Matt Shackelford
 Jake Longwell
 Scott Ferris
 Rankin Shaver
 Brian King
 Steve Pearl
 Nate Jones
 Alan Colletta
 Sally Poole
 Kyle Jameson
 Andy Heinze
 Ray Serafin
 Al Meilutis
 Tom Pethic
 Max Wheeler
 Cory Halloran
 Hal Johnson
 Kim Corcoran
 Dave Tomaselli
 Chuck Ingersoll

 The hosts of Sound Bytes: Nick Francesco, Dave Enright, and Steve Rea.

See also
 List of jazz radio stations in the United States

References

External links
 Jazz901.org Homepage
 http://hearchucknow.com/Soul_Jazz_Spectrum.html

GMC
GMC
Jazz radio stations in the United States
Radio stations established in 1975
Jazz in New York (state)